The 2012–13 season is the eleventh season in FC Vaslui's existence, and its eighth in a row in the top flight of Romanian football. Vaslui will seek to win their first trophy, competing in the Liga I, the Romanian Cup and the UEFA Champions League, after finishing second in the previous Liga I.

Review

Pre-season
Vaslui's pre-season transfers started as early as 23 May 2012, when Porumboiu announced they were going to sign Adrian Popa from Concordia Chiajna for an undisclosed fee. However, the transfer collapsed since the player failed his medical. On 24 May, it was reported that Vaslui dropped off the services of Jaime Bragança and Savio Nsereko. On 30 May, Vaslui president, Daniel Stanciu announced that Cape Verde international, Fernando Varela signed a three-year contract as a free agent to substitute Pavol Farkaš, and Romanian international, László Sepsi is going to join Vaslui. However, Sepsi eventually signed CFR Cluj.
On 31 May, Chievo Verona reported that they have signed Romanian international, Paul Papp for an undisclosed fee. Later that day, Porumboiu confirmed that Chievo Verona acquired 75% of the player's rights for more than €1,500,000. The media speculated that the real transfer fee is estimated around €2,500,000.

Vaslui's first and only pre-season training camp was set in Austria. Vaslui's first friendlies for the pre-season schedule were fixed against Czech champions Slovan Liberec and vice-champions Sparta Prague, and Russian Premier League side Terek Grozny. Four more friendlies were set up against Albania champions Skënderbeu Korçë, Russian side FC Krasnodar, Azerbaijan vice-champions Khazar Lankaran and a Regional League side from Austria.

To celebrate the first decade since the foundation, the club decided to change the crest. The new crest was accompanied by the words 'Ad Unum Omnes', translated 'All As One'. The change was not welcomed by Vaslui's fans, who claimed that once dropping the old crest, the club also drops off the history of the club.

On 9 June, media reported that two youngsters from Olimpia Satu Mare, Valter Heil and Ervin Zsiga are set to be taken on trial by Vaslui. On 13 June, Liviu Antal and Adrian Sălăgeanu joined Vaslui from Oţelul Galaţi for a joint fee of €700,000. Antal signed a four-year contract, while Sălăgeanu it is yet to sign. One day later, Irineu Calixto Couto joined Vaslui on trial. On 16 June, despite he previously agreed to extend his contract for one more year, Adaílton decided to retire from professional football, in order to be with his family. On the same day, FCM Târgu Mureș defender, Andrei Cordoş signed a two-year contract with Vaslui for an undisclosed fee. One day later, Vaslui signed Olhanense midfielder Cauê for an undisclosed fee, estimated to be around €700,000. On 18 June, Vaslui dropped off the services of the Brazilian defenders Anderson and Gladstone. On the same day, both Valter Heil and Ervin Zsiga signed a five-year contract with Vaslui. Vaslui also signed Leixões midfielder Eduardo Jumisse for an undisclosed fee. One day later, two more players were released, strikers Yero Bello and Răzvan Neagu. Despite media reported that midfielder Adrian Gheorghiu was also released, he played in the second half of the friendly against Khazar Lankaran. On 20 June, Vaslui signed Polish defender Piotr Celeban, after his contract with Śląsk Wrocław expired.

On the same day, Vaslui played its first pre-season friendly against Skënderbeu Korçë. Liviu Antal scored his first goal for Vaslui, assisted by Milanov in the 40th minute to win the match for the club. On 24 July, the team traveled to Kössen where they faced Khazar Lankaran. Vaslui took a 1–0 lead in the first half-hour through N'Doye, but Bonfim equalized in the 67th minute, establishing the final score. Nicolae Stanciu, who had worn the number 31 in the previous season, switched to the number 10 shirt following Adaílton's retirement. Three days later, Vaslui suffered its first defeat from the pre-season, losing 2–1 against Terek Grozny. Lebedenko opened the scoresheet in the 78th minute, before Ervin Zsiga equalised with an 85th-minute goal; however, three minutes later Terek restored their lead with a goal from Oleg Vlasov. On 1 July, Vaslui faced Gambrinus liga side Sparta Prague. Antal opened the score in the 8th minute, before Mario Holek equalized two minutes later. In the 12th minute, Reis scored his first goal for Vaslui, since he is on trial. A 51st-minute goal from Sparta Prague captain Marek Matějovský secured his team a draw, counting Vaslui's second draw from the pre-season.

Vaslui had also news regarding the staff, where Marius Baciu and Eduard Iordănescu have been appointed assistant managers on 14 and 26 June respectively. The appointment of Iordănescu without being consulted, drove Augusto Inácio mad and therefore, on 4 July he resigned from the manager position. Later that day, Porumboiu confirmed that Marius Şumudică has been appointed as the new manager.

On the same day, Vaslui faced the Regional League side Bischoffen. Since Inácio resigned earlier that day, Iordănescu took care of the team. Despite the start-up team consisted in bench players, they began to flow thick and fast as Vasile Buhăescu scored four goals, Nicolae Stanciu, Liviu Antal, Andrei Cordoş, Ervin Zsiga and Tiago Targino got one each to secure a 9–1 win. Şumudică's first two matches in charge ended in a 1–0 defeats against United Arab Emirates Olympic Team and Slovan Liberec on 6 and 7 July respectively.

On 9 July, Sergiu Popovici was loaned out to Gloria Bistrița for one season long. On the same day, striker Sabrin Sburlea signed from Rapid București for an undisclosed fee, thought to be €750,000. On 11 July, Vaslui traveled to Kirchdorf in Tirol to face FC Krasnodar. Wesley scored a brace, counting Şumudică's first win as Vaslui manager. A goalless draw against Saudi Professional League side Ittihad FC ended Vaslui's pre-season, on 12 July.

On 13 July, Marius Constantin returned to his former club Rapid București, signing a four-year contract for an undisclosed fee, believed to be around €250,000. In return, Vaslui opted for a cheaper deal signing free agent Elias Charalambous on a one-year contract, after his contract with Karlsruher SC expired. Three days later, Dănuţ Coman signed a two-year contract from Rapid București, for a reported fee of €62,000. Two days before the opening match for Vaslui, Marius Niculae signed a two-year contract from Dinamo București, for a reported fee of €300,000.

Liga I
The fixtures for the 2012–13 season were announced on 11 June, with an early Liga I title contender clash against Rapid București in the opening match, for the third year in a row.

On 22 July, Vaslui travelled to Bucharest to face Rapid București for the third year in a row in the opening match. It took Vaslui just over half an hour to open the scoring against Rapid; when N'Doye fed Wesley inside the box and the Brazilian scored with a right-footed strike towards the left corner of Călin Albuț's goal. Daniel Pancu equalized in the stoppage-time of the first half, from a free-kick obtained by him. Vaslui took the lead, three minutes from the second half, when Celeban threw up the ball, Niculae crossed with a header for Wesley, whose scissor-kick execution put the ball past Albuț. Rapid equalized with a late goal, when Filipe Teixeira scored with a header, following Ștefan Grigorie's corner.

First-team squad

 T=Total
 L=Liga I
 C=Cupa României
 I=UEFA Europa League, Intertoto UEFA Cup

Transfers

Summer

In

Out

Statistics

Appearances and goals
Last updated on 1 June 2013.

|-
|colspan="12"|Players sold or loaned out during the season
|-

|}

Top scorers

Disciplinary record

Overall

{|class="wikitable"
|-
|Games played || 39 (34 Liga I, 2 UEFA Champions League, 2 UEFA Europa League, 1 Romanian Cup)
|-
|Games won || 16 (16 Liga I)
|-
|Games drawn ||  12 (10 Liga I, 1 UEFA Champions League, 1 UEFA Europa League)
|-
|Games lost || 11 (8 Liga I, 1 UEFA Champions League, 1 UEFA Europa League, 1 Romanian Cup)
|-
|Goals scored || 54
|-
|Goals conceded || 43
|-
|Goal difference || +11
|-
|Yellow cards || 78
|-
|Red cards || 2
|-
|Worst discipline || Zhivko Milanov (9  and 1 )
|-
|Best result || 3–0 (H) v Petrolul Ploieşti – Liga I – 28 Jul 2012 3–0 (A) v Gloria Bistriţa – Liga I – 18 Aug 2012 3–0 (H) v Concordia Chiajna – Liga I – 29 Sep 2012 3–0 (H) v CSMS Iaşi – Liga I – 26 Nov 2012 4–1 (H) v Dinamo București – Liga I – 18 May 2013
|-
|Worst result || 0–3 (A) v CFR Cluj – Liga I – 4 Aug 20121–4 (H) v Fenerbahçe – Champions League – 8 Aug 2012
|-
|Most appearances ||  Fernando Varela (36 appearances) Liviu Antal (36 appearances) Nicolae Stanciu (36 appearances)
|-
|Top scorer ||  Marius Niculae (12 goals)
|-
|Points || 58/102 (56.86.%)
|-

Performances
Updated to games played on 30 May 2013.

Goal minutes
Updated to games played on 30 May 2013.

International appearances

Liga I

League table

Results summary

Results by round

Matches

Pre-season matches

Inter-season matches

Copa del Sol

Friendlies

Liga I

UEFA Champions League

Third qualifying round

UEFA Europa League

Play-Off Round

Cupa României

References 

FC Vaslui seasons
Vaslui
Vaslui
Vaslui